Platygyriella kirtikarii is a species of moss from the genus Platygyriella. It was discovered in Asia and only occurs in Asia. Before the name Platygyriella kirtikarii, it was named Bryosedgwickia kirtikarii by Cardot & Dixon.

References

Hypnaceae